Torynorrhina is genus of beetles  belonging to the family Scarabaeidae, subfamily Cetoniinae. This genus is closely related to the genus Rhomborhina. They can be separated only by examining the difference on the mesosternal process. Species of this genus are present in Thailand, Assam, Malaysia and China.

Species
 Torynorrhina apicalis (Westwood, 1842)
 Torynorrhina distincta (Hope, 1841)
 Torynorrhina flammea (Gestro, 1888)
 Torynorrhina fulvopilosa Moser, 1911
 Torynorrhina hyacinthina (Hope, 1841)
 Torynorrhina laotica Nonfried, 1906
 Torynorrhina opalina (Hope, 1831)
 Torynorrhina pilifera (Moser, 1914)
 Torynorrhina scutellata (Paulian, 1960)
 Torynorrhina thiemei Moser, 1901

References
 Biolib
 Zipcodezoo

Cetoniinae